Fenestraja is a genus of eight species of skate in the family Gurgesiellidae. They are found in deeper waters of the western Atlantic (including the Caribbean and Gulf of Mexico) and the Indian Ocean (east to Bali).

Species 
 Fenestraja atripinna (Bigelow & Schroeder, 1950) (Blackfin pygmy skate)
 Fenestraja cubensis (Bigelow & Schroeder, 1950) (Cuban pygmy skate)
 Fenestraja ishiyamai (Bigelow & Schroeder, 1962) (Plain pygmy skate)
 Fenestraja maceachrani (Séret, 1989) (Madagascar pygmy skate)
 Fenestraja mamillidens (Alcock, 1889) (Prickly skate)
 Fenestraja plutonia (Garman, 1881) (Pluto skate)
 Fenestraja sibogae (M. C. W. Weber, 1913) (Siboga skate)
 Fenestraja sinusmexicanus (Bigelow & Schroeder, 1950) (Gulf of Mexico pygmy skate)

References 

 

Rajiformes
Ray genera
Taxa named by John D. McEachran
Taxa named by Leonard Compagno